Ambatomanoina is a rural municipality in Analamanga Region, in the Central Highlands of Madagascar. It belongs to the district of Anjozorobe and its populations numbers to 21,779 in 2018.

It is situated in a distance of 103 km from the countries capital Antananarivo of which only 25 km are a paved national road.  The remaining 78 km are by a secondary unpaved road that renders access difficult in the rainy season.
To the commune belong 11 fokontany (villages).  It has been connected to electricity since 2019.

Economy
The economy is based on agriculture.  Rice, corn, peanuts, beans, manioc, soja and onions are the main crops.

Roads
The unpaved Provincial Road 19 links Ambatomanoina to Talata Volonondry (70km).

References

Populated places in Analamanga